St Joseph College of Communication, Changanassery (SJCC), is the first university affiliated media college in South India and was founded in August 2004.  It is a Christian minority self-financing education institution affiliated to Mahatma Gandhi University, Kottayam, Kerala, India. SJCC   has completed its 17 years of dedicated service to the society in “transforming the media for a wholesome world”.The college is first of its kind in South India hosting more than 1000 students in 8 undergraduate and 5 postgraduate career oriented programs in Media Studies and Mass Communication. The college offers Bachelor and Master of Arts university degrees in Multimedia, Animation, Graphic Design, Cinema & Television, Print and Electronic journalism, Visual Arts (Interior Design), Visual Effects, and Audiography & Digital Editing and more. Visit their website for more information. The resource pool at SJCC and the exchange of ideas taking place here is unparalleled. On the job training and special communication skill development programs are the unique benefits of studying at SJCC.

History
St Joseph College of Communication affiliated to MG University was established in August 2004 and formally inaugurated by Oommen Chandy, the Chief Minister of Kerala, in the presence of the founder, Archbishop Emeritus Mar Joseph Powathil, on 2 July 2005.

Media Village was dedicated to the nation by former President of India A. P. J. Abdul Kalam.

Courses
 BA Multimedia
 BA Visual Communication
 BA Animation and Graphic Design
 BA Visual Arts (Interior Designing)
 BA Animation and Visual Effects
 BA Audiography and Digital Editing
 B.Com Finance and Taxation
 B.Com Co-operation
 MA Cinema and television
 MA Animation
 MA Graphic Design
 MA Multimedia
 MA Print and Electronic Journalism

Facilities
 FM Radio Station (Radio Media Village 90.8)
 Dolby Atmos Premix Studio
 Online TV Channel (MVTV)
 TV Studio with Teleprompter
 Greenmatte Studio
 2D Animation Lab
 3D Animation Lab
 Stop Motion Lab
 Sculpting Studio
 Digital Classrooms
 Media Village Publications
 Well equipped Audio studios for Recording, Dubbing and Editing (Media Village Studios)

References

External links

Animation schools in India
Christian universities and colleges in India
Arts and Science colleges in Kerala
Colleges affiliated to Mahatma Gandhi University, Kerala
Universities and colleges in Kottayam district
Educational institutions established in 2004
2004 establishments in Kerala
Changanassery